The Myanmar National Literature Awards for Collected Short Stories are an award presented to an author who has written a collection of short stories. This award has been awarded since 1962.

See also
 Myanmar National Literature Award

1962 establishments in Burma
Burmese literary awards